Action-specific perception, or perception-action, is a psychological theory that people perceive their environment and events within it in terms of their ability to act. This theory hence suggests that a person's capability to carry out a particular task affects how they perceive the different aspects and methods involved in that task. For example, softball players who are hitting better see the ball as bigger.  Tennis players see the ball as moving slower when they successfully return the ball. In the field of human-computer interaction, alterations in accuracy impact both the perception of size and time, while adjustments in movement speed impact the perception of distance. Furthermore, the perceiver's intention to act is also critical; while the perceiver's ability to perform the intended action influences perception, the perceiver's abilities for unintended actions have little or no effect on perception. Finally, the objective difficulty of the task appears to modulate size, distance, and time perception.

Overview

Action-specific effects have been documented in a variety of contexts and with a variety of manipulations.  The original work was done on perceived slant of hills and perceived distance to targets. Hills look steeper and targets look farther away when wearing a heavy backpack.  In addition to walking, many other actions influence perception such as throwing, jumping, falling, reaching, grasping, kicking, hitting, blocking, and swimming.  In addition to perceived slant and perceived distance, other aspects of perception are influenced by ability such as size, shape, height, and speed.  These results have been documented in athletes such as softball players, golfers, tennis players, swimmers, and people skilled in parkour. However, a criticism would be that these action-specific effects on perception may surface only in extreme cases (e.g.,  professional athletes) or condition (e.g., steep hills). Recent evidence from virtual reality, indicated that these action-specific effects are observed in both "normal" conditions and average individuals.

Background
The action-specific perception account has roots in Gibson's (1979) ecological approach to perception.  According to Gibson, the primary objects of perception are affordances, which are the possibilities for action.  Affordances capture the mutual relationship between the environment and the perceiver.  For example, a tall wall is a barrier to an elderly person but affords jumping-over to someone trained in parkour, or urban climbing.  Like the ecological approach, the action-specific perception account favors the notion that perception involves processes that relate the environment to the perceiver's potential for action.  Consequently, similar environments will look different, depending on the abilities of each perceiver. Since abilities change over time, an individual's perception of similar environments will also change as their abilities change.

Criticisms
The claim that activity and intention influence perception is controversial.  These findings challenge traditional theories of perception, nearly all of which conceptualize perception as a process that provides an objective and behaviorally-independent representation of the environment. The fact that the same environment looks different depending on the perceiver's abilities and intentions implies that perception is not behaviorally-neutral.

Alternative explanations for apparent action-specific effects have been proposed, most commonly that the perceiver's ability affects the perceiver's judgment about what they see, rather than affecting perception itself.  In other words, perceivers see the world similarly but then report their impressions differently.

Problems
Perception cannot be measured directly.  Instead, researchers must rely on reports, judgments, and behaviors.  However, many attempts have been made to resolve this issue.  One technique is to use many different kinds of perceptual judgments.  For example, action-specific effects have been found when verbal reports and visual matching tasks. Action-specific effects are also apparent with indirect measures such as perceived parallelism as a proxy for perceived distance.  Action-specific effects have also been found when using action-based measures such as Blindwalking.

See also
 Active inference – a generic formulation of embodied perception based on variational (Bayesian) free energy minimisation
 Active vision – an area of computer vision and machine learning concerned with active sampling of sensory data
 Affordance
 Ecological psychology
 James J. Gibson
 Motor cognition – the notion that cognition is embodied in action, and that the motor system participates in what is usually considered as mental processing.
 Motor theory of speech perception – the hypothesis that people perceive spoken words by identifying the vocal tract gestures with which they are pronounced rather than by identifying the sound patterns that speech generates.
 Perception
 Qualia
 Embodied cognition

References 

Visual perception
Perception
Enactive cognition
Action (philosophy)